The men's 5000 meter at the 2011 KNSB Dutch Single Distance Championships took place in Heerenveen at the Thialf ice skating rink on Friday 5 November 2010. Although this tournament was held in 2010 it was part of the speed skating season 2010–2011. There were 20 participants.

Statistics

Result

Source:

Draw

References

Single Distance Championships
2011 Single Distance